Place de Wagram is a square in the 17th arrondissement of Paris, at the junction of Boulevard Malesherbes, Boulevard Pereire and Avenue de Wagram. It forms one end of Avenue de Wagram (the other is Place de l'Étoile) and was renamed after the 1809 French victory at Wagram in 1868.

Wagram
Buildings and structures in the 17th arrondissement of Paris